Steadlür is the debut studio album by Steadlür.

Track listing
"Poison"
"Bumpin'"
"My Mom Hates Me"
"Turn It Up"
"It's Too Late"
"Whisky And Women"
"Angel (On the Wrong Side of Town)"
"Time"
"Suffocate"
"Barely Breathing"
"Livin' a Lie"
"Change"
"Run, Run, Run" (Japanese Bonus Track)

Personnel
Philip Steadlür - lead vocals, guitar
Tommy Steadlür - lead guitar
Daniel Steadlür - bass guitar, vocals
Dallas Steadlür - drums, backing vocals

Chart performance

References

2009 debut albums